Route 886 is a regional north-south highway in the far north of Israel.  It begins in the south at Highway 89 and ends in the north at Route 899.

Description of the route
 The route begins in the south at Ein Zeitim junction with Highway 89 in Ein Zeitim.
 3 km north, it meets the entrance road going east into Dalton, and a separate entrance road going west toward Jish.
 At 4 km, it passes the Ramat Dalton Industrial Park.
 At 5 km, it meets an entrance road on the west to Kerem Ben Zimra.
 The road turns northeast.  At 7 km, it meets an entrance road on the west to Rehaniya.
 At 8 km, it meets an entrance road to the east to Alma.
 At 13 km, it meets an entrance road to the west to Dishon.
 At 15 km, it meets Route 8977 going to the north into Ramot Naftali.
 At 16 km, it meets a second entrance road to the west to Ramot Naftali.
 At 17 km, the road ends at Yesha junction with Route 899.

See also
List of highways in Israel

886